Bácsszőlős (Croatian: Prlković, also Perleković and Crvena šuma) is a village and municipality in Bács-Kiskun county, in the Southern Great Plain region of southern Hungary.

Geography

Trivia 
2006, this village won the county award for the best decorated village (with flowers).

References

External links 
 Bácsszőlős Önkormányzatának honlapja 

Populated places in Bács-Kiskun County